Andre Begemann and Martin Emmrich won the first edition of the tournament, defeating Treat Conrad Huey and Dominic Inglot in the final, 7–5, 6–2.

Seeds

Draw

Draw

References
 Main Draw

Power Horse Cupandnbsp;- Doubles
2013 Doubles
2013 in German tennis